Ji Woon-soo's Stroke of Luck is a 2012 South Korean television series that aired on cable channel TV Chosun from April 21 to June 24, 2012 on Saturdays and Sundays at 18:50 for 20 episodes. It marks film actor Im Chang-jung's first TV starring role in his 21-year career.

Plot
Ji Woon-soo is an average office worker who dreams of turning his life around. He is unlucky at everything he does and is never proactive about anything. Until one day, he experiences a stroke of extremely good luck and wins the lottery, going through the many ups and downs that follow.

Cast
Im Chang-jung - Ji Woon-soo
Seo Young-hee - Lee Eun-hee 
Lee Se-eun - Han Soo-kyung 
Choi Kyu-hwan - assistant manager Cha Dae-ri
Yoon Da-hoon - section chief Choi
Lee Moon-sik - Company president Baek
Park Hyo-jun - Oh Kyung-hoon
Lee Kyung-jin - Mrs. Na, Woon-soo's mother
Choi Joo-bong - Mr. Lee, Eun-hee's father
Hong Yeo-jin - Mrs. Jeon, Eun-hee's mother
 Yoo Jae-myung - Min Seo's father
Lee Joo-hyun - Lee Geum-hee
Jang Won-young - Woon-chil
Shin Seo-hyun - Seo-hyun
Hwang Tae-kwang - Ji Jae-soo
Zuno - Lee Dong-hee
Kang Jae-sub - Moon Sang-joong
Yoo Min-ho - Han Joong-il
Moon Ji-young - Jin Sang-hee
Jung Ji-yoon as Reporter	
Choi Daniel - cameo
Han Yeo-wool

References

External links
 Ji Woon-soo's Stroke of Luck official TV Chosun website 
 

2012 South Korean television series debuts
2012 South Korean television series endings
Korean-language television shows
TV Chosun television dramas